Aaron Krickstein was the defending champion.

Krickstein successfully defended his title, beating Shahar Perkiss in the final, 6–4, 6–1.

Seeds

Draw

Finals

Top half

Bottom half

References

 Main Draw

Tel Aviv Open
1984 Grand Prix (tennis)